The prismanes are a class of hydrocarbon compounds consisting of prism-like polyhedra of various numbers of sides on the polygonal base. Chemically, it is a series of fused cyclobutane rings (a ladderane, with all-cis/all-syn geometry) that wraps around to join its ends and form a band, with cycloalkane edges. Their chemical formula is (C2H2)n, where n is the number of cyclobutane sides (the size of the cycloalkane base), and that number also forms the basis for a system of nomenclature within this class. The first few chemicals in this class are:

Triprismane, tetraprismane, and pentaprismane have been synthesized and studied experimentally, and many higher members of the series have been studied using computer models. The first several members do indeed have the geometry of a regular prism, with flat n-gon bases. As n becomes increasingly large, however, modeling experiments find that highly symmetric geometry is no longer stable, and the molecule distorts into less-symmetric forms. One series of modelling experiments found that starting with [11]prismane, the regular-prism form is not a stable geometry. For example, the structure of [12]prismane would have the cyclobutane chain twisted, with the dodecagonal bases non-planar and non-parallel.

Nonconvex prismanes 

For large base-sizes, some of the cyclobutanes can be fused anti to each other, giving a non-convex polygon base. These are geometric isomers of the prismanes. Two isomers of [12]prismane that have been studied computationally are named helvetane and israelane, based on the star-like shapes of the rings that form their bases. This was explored computationally after originally being proposed as an April fools joke. Their names refer to the shapes found on the flags of Switzerland and Israel, respectively.

Polyprismanes 

The polyprismanes consist of multiple prismanes stacked base-to-base. The carbons at each intermediate level—the n-gon bases where the prismanes fuse to each other—have no hydrogen atoms attached to them.

Related structures

The asteranes contain a methylene group bridge on each edge between the two n-gon bases. Each side is thus a cyclohexane rather than a cyclobutane.

References

External links 

 Triprismane
 Cubane
 Pentaprismane
 Hexaprismane

Molecular geometry
Polycyclic nonaromatic hydrocarbons